Pott may refer to:

People
 Pott (surname)
 Potts (surname)

Places
Pott, a hamlet in the parish of Ilton cum Pott in North Yorkshire, England
Pott, a colloquial name for the Ruhr region in Germany

Other
 Pott disease, a form of tuberculosis
 Pott (rum), a German rum brand

See also 
Pot (disambiguation)
Potts (disambiguation)